Ulubey, formerly Göbek, is a town and district of Uşak Province in the inner Aegean Region of  Turkey.

The district is famous for Ulubey Canyon and the ruins of Blaundus.

References

Populated places in Uşak Province
Districts of Uşak Province